Infant Jesus School (IJS) is a private semi-sectarian school established in 1988, the Department of Education, Culture and Sports recognized the Elementary department in 1993 and the High School department in 1999. The school also serves as the External Testing Center for admission to De La Salle University.

History

Under the inspiration and patronage of 
the Holy Child Jesus, the school started in 
1988 with 67 pupils in  primary grades.  
In the second year of operation, the 
enrollment increased which prompted the school to transfer from Pastrana Street to Roxas 
Avenue and then to Osmena Avenue, Kalibo in the following years. 
	
	With the growing number of enrollees, the school moved on to complete preschool and grade school with the first 14 graduates in 1992, and eventually recognized by the government.

	To accommodate the growing population, the school transferred to its acquired site in Mabini Extension in 1993.  After several years of unstable administration, the new Board of Trustees took over the school in 1995 headed by the new President, Mrs. Merle L. Altas.  To set direction for the school, the Board of Trustees requested the Supervision of Jimmy Boy H. Estrellas starting in 1995 until he eventually became full-time School Director in 1997.  He initiated improvements in facilities, curriculum, discipline, religious dimension and resource mobilization.

	With the battle cry "Big Dreams Start from Small Beginnings," and a vision of complete basic Christian education in the new millennium - 2000, the school was granted government permit to operate secondary course starting with First Year in 1996.  It was eventually granted government recognition in 1999, a year before the first high school graduates – the millennium batch of 2000.

	To maximize the limited area of only 1000 sqm., the old dilapidated buildings were converted for vertical expansion. The right wing was named Sto. Niño Building in honor of the school's patron, for the first high school classrooms. The other building, known as St. Joseph’s Building was converted into three-story with rooftop Function Hall and was completed in the summer of 2003. It was also in the same year that the school acquired part of the lot for the construction of the temporary canteen, quadrangle and basketball court.  To complete the vertical expansion, the Blessed Virgin Mary main building was constructed in 2006 to house the administrative offices, Library, Audio-Visual Room, Science and Computer Labs.  These three-adjoined buildings were dedicated to the Holy Family, whose intercession made IJS what it is today.  

	Divine providence is clearly a source of inspiration for the school's 25 years of existence.  With the onset of K to 12 Enhanced Basic Education, the school started with the horizontal expansion by acquiring the adjacent area for the construction of the proposed Senior High School Building and Covered Court.

See also
 List of schools in Kalibo, Aklan

References

Schools
Schools in Aklan